Anthony Shavies (born September 9, 1983) is an American former professional basketball player.

Professional career 
In his first two seasons Shavies played in Austria for Güssing Knights and Wörthersee Piraten. In 2007, he left for Panthers Fürstenfeld, he played with the Panthers for four straight seasons.

In the 2012–13 season he played for MBC Mykolaiv in Ukraine and averaged around 9 points per game.

In 2013 Shavies returned to Güssing, when he signed a one-year contract. He won the title with the Knights, after they beat Kapfenberg 3–2 in the Finals. Shavies was named Finals MVP for the second time in his career.

References

External links 
Agency profile
Draftexpress profile
Eurobasket profile

1983 births
Living people
American expatriate basketball people in Austria
American expatriate basketball people in Ukraine
Basketball players from Oakland, California
BSC Fürstenfeld Panthers players
Chabot Gladiators men's basketball players
MBC Mykolaiv players
Missouri State Bears basketball players
Point guards
American men's basketball players